Patrick Myles is an Irish actor, filmmaker and producer.

Trained at the Bristol Old Vic Theatre School and with Philippe Gaulier, his stage work as an actor includes Henry VI, Part 1, Henry VI, Part 2 and Henry VI, Part 3 for Shakespeare's Globe, The Black Diamond for Punchdrunk, Eugene O'Neill's The Hairy Ape at Southwark Playhouse, Towards Zero and The Unexpected Guest by Agatha Christie at The Mill at Sonning and directed by Brian Blessed, Much Ado About Nothing for Shakespeare in the Squares, Romeo and Juliet for Creation Theatre, Bush Bazaar for the Bush Theatre, The Spanish Tragedy at the Arcola Theatre, Love's a Luxury at the Orange Tree Theatre, A Chorus of Disapproval (play) written and directed by Alan Ayckbourn, Icons and Everafter at the Stephen Joseph Theatre, Tartuffe and Pera Palas at the Arcola Theatre, The Freedom of the City and The Lady's Not for Burning at the Finborough Theatre, The Revenger's Tragedy at the Southwark Playhouse, Romeo and Juliet and Othello for Midas Touch Productions, Harold Pinter's Victoria Station (play) at The King's Head Theatre. His film and TV credits include Planespotting, Head vs Heart, The Bill, Secret Smile and Red Thursday.

He wrote and directed the BAFTA-longlisted short film The Overcoat, with Jason Watkins, Vicki Pepperdine, Tim Key, Alex Macqueen and adapted from Nikolai Gogol's short story, A Pornographer Woos, with Michael Smiley and adapted from Bernard MacLaverty's short story, Henry VI, Part 1 as part of Shakespeare's Globe's Complete Walk, Telling Laura, with Colin Hoult and Louise Ford, Anthropopopometry, with Peter McDonald and Lloyd Hutchinson, Santa's Blotto, with Brian Blessed, which premiered at the BFI London Film Festival and was made with Film London support. Other writing work includes Will: The Lost Years, which won the Channel Four/Stellar Network Pitch Up Competition in 2009.

Producing work includes the stage adaptation of Paddy Chayefsky's Network (film), adapted by Lee Hall (playwright), directed by Ivo van Hove and starring Bryan Cranston and Michelle Dockery, in a co-production with the Royal National Theatre, which transferred to the Belasco Theatre on Broadway, the New York transfer of Fleabag, written by and with Phoebe Waller-Bridge at the SoHo Playhouse, the West End production of Lady Day at Emerson's Bar and Grill, with Audra McDonald at Wyndham's Theatre, David Mamet's Glengarry Glen Ross, with Jonathan Pryce and Aidan Gillen, at the Apollo Theatre, Orwell: A Celebration at the Trafalgar Studios, Family Affair by Alexander Ostrovsky at the Arcola Theatre, as well as productions for Doublethink Theatre, of which he is artistic director.

He was nominated for the Laurence Olivier Bursary while at Bristol Old Vic Theatre School, nominated for Best Supporting Actor award at Thessaloniki International Film Festival for Red Thursday, was part of the Old Vic’s T.S. Eliot US/UK Exchange, was shortlisted for the Lloyds TSB Enterprising Young Brits Award, is an alumnus of the BFI London Film Festival's Think/Shoot/Distribute talent campus and Shakespeare's Globe's Directing Studio, and is the recipient of the Society of London Theatre/Stage One New Producer Bursary.

See also
Doublethink Theatre

External links
 
 Doublethink Theatre

Living people
Year of birth missing (living people)
Alumni of Bristol Old Vic Theatre School
Irish male stage actors
Irish male television actors